David M. Scanlan (born June 14, 1956) is an American politician and election official serving as the 54th Secretary of State of New Hampshire. He assumed office as Acting Secretary of State upon the resignation of Bill Gardner on January 10, 2022. He was elected to a new two-year term as Secretary of State on December 7, 2022. He previously served as Deputy Secretary of State of New Hampshire since 2002 and was a Republican member of the New Hampshire House of Representatives from 1984 to 2002, becoming Majority Leader of the House in his final term.

Early life and career
Scanlan was born in Bellefonte, Pennsylvania. Prior to entering politics, he worked as a forester. On January 3, 2022, the New Hampshire Secretary of State Bill Gardner announced his retirement as Secretary of State prior to the end of his term. Scanlan succeeded him on an acting basis to serve the remainder of Gardner's term. Scanlon was elected to a new two-year term by the New Hampshire House of Representatives on December 7, 2022.

References

|-

|-

1956 births
20th-century American politicians
21st-century American politicians
Living people
Republican Party members of the New Hampshire House of Representatives
People from Bellefonte, Pennsylvania
Secretaries of State of New Hampshire
West Virginia University alumni